Matthew Davis (born 1978) is an American actor.

Matthew Davis or Matt Davis may also refer to:

Matthew Davis (politician) (fl. 1937–1938), Irish Fianna Fáil politician
Matthew L. Davis, who in 1836 published the memoirs of Aaron Burr
 Matthew Davis, the programmer of video game FTL: Faster Than Light
Matthew Davis (physicist), New Zealand/Australian physicist
Matt Davis (comedian) (born 1979), American stand-up comedian
Matt Davis (Coronation Street), fictional character in the British soap opera
"Matt Davis", a song by the US ska band The Toasters, from the album Skaboom
Matt Davis (rugby league) (born 1996), British rugby player

See also
Matthew Davies (disambiguation)